Cejas may refer to:

People

Agustín Cejas, Argentine footballer
Mauro Cejas, Argentine footballer
Maximiliano Cejas, Argentine footballer
Paul L. Cejas, Cuban-born American businessman
Sebastián Cejas, Argentine footballer

Places
Las Cejas, Argentine village
 Cejas, Comerío, Puerto Rico, a barrio in the municipality Comerío, in Puerto Rico

See also 
Ceja (disambiguation)

Spanish-language surnames